Letladi Madubanya (born 13 February 1984 in Alexandra) is a South African football (soccer) defensive midfielder who last played for Baroka in the Premier Soccer League.

Madubanya has won the league twice with SuperSport United, and his goal against Ajax Cape Town on the final day of the 2016/17 season ensured Baroka finished 15th and qualified for the promotion playoffs.

References

1984 births
Living people
People from Alexandra, Gauteng
Sportspeople from Gauteng
South African soccer players
Association football midfielders
Bay United F.C. players
SuperSport United F.C. players
Bloemfontein Celtic F.C. players
AmaZulu F.C. players
Bidvest Wits F.C. players
Platinum Stars F.C. players
Baroka F.C. players